The commander-in-chief of Defence Services is the commander-in-chief of the Tatmadaw, the armed forces of Myanmar. Since a state of emergency was declared following the 2021 military coup d'état, the commander-in-chief has been the highest authority in the country, with plenary power delegated by the president and the National Defence and Security Council (NDSC). Even in peacetime, however, the Tatmadaw is an independent branch of government not directly under the command of the president, with the commander-in-chief answering only to the full NDSC chaired by the president.

According to the 2008 Constitution of Myanmar, the commander-in-chief is appointed by the president upon nomination by the NDSC, chaired by the president; the commander-in-chief is also a member of the NDSC. Article 418 of the 2008 Constitution allows the commander-in-chief broad authority over the government if the president declares a state of emergency in coordination with the NDSC. This happened after the 2021 military coup d'état: military-installed Acting President Myint Swe declared a state of emergency and transferred power to Commander-in-Chief Min Aung Hlaing, who then formed a military junta, the State Administration Council.

The current commander-in-chief is Senior General Min Aung Hlaing, since 30 March 2011.

List of commanders-in-chief

Timeline

Notes

References

Commander-in-Chief of Defence Services
Myanmar
Commander-in-Chief of Defence Services